Peter Locke may refer to:

 Peter Locke (darts player) (born 1956), Welsh professional darts player
 Peter Locke (producer), American film producer

See also
Peter Lock (born 1944), Archdeacon of Rochester